Yvandro Borges Sanches (born 24 May 2004) is a Luxembourger professional footballer who plays for Bundesliga club Borussia Mönchengladbach and the Luxembourg national team.

Club career 
Borges Sanches arrived in Borussia on the summer 2020, from the Luxembourgian club of Racing-Union. Progressing through the youth ranks of M'gladbach, he also played his first senior game in the summer 2021, during a friendly against Bayern Munich.

In the early 2021–22 season, he was part of the under-19 team, regularly scoring for the Borussen youth.

International career 
Already a youth international with Luxembourg, Yvandro Borges Sanches made his debut with the under-21 in June 2021.

Called to the national senior team by Luc Holtz for the first time in August 2021, he made his international debut for Luxembourg on the 4 September 2021, coming on as a late substitute in the European Championship qualifying 4–1 defeat against Serbia. On September 7, 2021, he made his debut in the starting lineup against Qatar. In that game he scored his first international goal in the 31st minute for Luxembourg.

International goals
Scores and results list Luxembourg's goal tally first.

References

External links

2004 births
Living people
Sportspeople from Luxembourg City
Luxembourgian footballers
Luxembourg international footballers
Luxembourg youth international footballers
Luxembourgian people of Cape Verdean descent
Association football midfielders
Luxembourgian expatriate footballers
Luxembourgian expatriate sportspeople in Germany
Expatriate footballers in Germany
Borussia Mönchengladbach II players
Borussia Mönchengladbach players